Germain Van Der Moere (29 November 1922 – 11 May 2018) was a Belgian sprint canoeist who competed from the mid-1950s to the early 1960s. He won a gold medal in the K-2 1000 m event at the 1958 ICF Canoe Sprint World Championships in Prague. Van Der Moere also competed in two Summer Olympics, earning his best finish of sixth in the K-2 1000 m event at Melbourne in 1956.

References

 "Kano & Kajak" (magazine of VKKF, Flemish canoe and kayak federation) issue 124, p. 28

1922 births
2018 deaths
Belgian male canoeists
Canoeists at the 1956 Summer Olympics
Canoeists at the 1960 Summer Olympics
Olympic canoeists of Belgium
ICF Canoe Sprint World Championships medalists in kayak
Sportspeople from Ghent